, formerly simply  and colloquially referred to as , are a Japanese girl group, holding the second highest overall single sales (of a female group) on the Oricon charts as of February 2012, with the Oricon record of most top ten singles with an amount of 64.

Morning Musume was formed in 1997 by rock singer-songwriter turned record producer Tsunku, who later composed the vast majority of the group's songs over the decade. They are the lead group of Hello! Project that specialises in upbeat, pop-oriented music coupled with dance performance. The group produced several splinter groups, and often collaborates with other Hello! Project acts, including Country Musume, Berryz Kobo, Cute, Melon Kinenbi, and v-u-den. The group's name can be translated as "Morning Girls" or "Morning Daughters"; as the name suggests, it consists of members mostly in their late adolescence and early 20s.

History

1997-1998: Formation and beginnings
Japanese producer Tsunku started the group in 1997 through an audition for a female rock vocalist for his band Sharam Q. The audition was held on the Japanese TV show Asayan. The winner was Michiyo Heike, later to become a soloist under what would eventually become known as Hello! Project. Tsunku decided to form a girl group consisting of five of the runners-up: Natsumi Abe, Yuko Nakazawa, Kaori Iida, Asuka Fukuda, and Aya Ishiguro. They were issued a challenge to sell 50,000 copies of their demo single, "Ai no Tane", with just five days of promotion events. They managed the feat in four promotion days (spread out over November 1997) in a very grassroots manner, and Tsunku began his mission to create the most famous all-girl group in Japan.

In early 1998, the girls were ready with their first official single, "Morning Coffee". The success of this single (hitting number six on the Japanese pop charts) brought them three new members known as the second generation: Kei Yasuda, Mari Yaguchi, and Sayaka Ichii, bringing the total member count to eight. The second single, "Summer Night Town", was the first single of the new lineup—a mature pop tune about unsuccessfully attempting to hide one's true feelings. Their third single, "Daite Hold on Me!", continued in the same vein musically as Summer Night Town, and managed to hit number one on the charts. Leader Nakazawa also started her solo career.

"First Time" was released in July 1998, featuring the singles "Ai no Tane", "Morning Coffee" and "Summer Night Town".

That year, Tsunku also formed Tanpopo, the first subgroup of Morning Musume, with Kaori Iida, Aya Ishiguro, and Mari Yaguchi. Tanpopo touted slower, more mature songs.

When "Morning Coffee" was released, however, Morning Musume's label Zetima went by a different name, One Up Music (One Up is a combination of Warner Music Japan (the label that distributed One Up Music's catalog) and Up-Front Group (One Up Music's parent company)). However, in April 1998, one month before the release of "Summer Night Town", One Up Music ended its distribution deal with Warner, and was rebranded as Zetima when it merged with Y.J. Sounds (another former Up-Front Group-affiliated label). Distribution rights would be given to Sony Music Japan's sub label Epic Records for "Summer Night Town", "First Time" and all of Zetima's subsequent releases.

1999: Commercial success with "Love Machine" and the 3rd Generation
The group released its fourth single "Memory Seishun no Hikari" in early 1999, reaching number two on Oricon, second to Glay's "Winter, Again" which had 1st week sales of 955,780 copies, verse Memory Seishun no Hikari's 195,720.

The song features rap passages by L The Headtoucha and intense vocal harmonization by the group's members. This was Asuka Fukuda's last single with Morning Musume, making her currently the shortest-lived member at 2 years. Asuka claimed that she was leaving in order to focus on her studies, only to drop out of school soon after.

"Manatsu no Kōsen" was released in May and was a summer tune. It went to number three on the charts, and the sales dropped by half from Memory Seishun no Hikari. Morning Musume's chart position was visibly lagging at the time: their sixth single, "Furusato", only sealed the fact. Natsumi Abe was the only one who sang the melody on "Furusato"; the other members just harmonized discreetly. This was their fifth single, and the sales once again decreased by half.

Second Morning was released in July 1999, and contained the singles "Daite Hold on Me!", "Memory Seishun no Hikari", "Manatsu no Kōsen", and "Furusato". "Daite Hold on Me!" and "Manatsu no Kōsen" were remixed.

Eager to add new life to the group, Tsunku held auditions for the third generation of Morning Musume. Two girls were expected to be admitted, but eventually only Maki Goto was added. Goto was 13, the youngest member of Morning Musume at the time. The group's seventh single, "Love Machine", sold 1,760,000 copies, making it a major hit; it is still their highest-selling single as of 2012. The song touted an image of Japan as the future "envy of the world" and cheered the masses during a period of economic recession. It was Maki Goto's first single and Aya Ishiguro's last. Its wild success dramatically increased the popularity of the group.

Soon Goto was paired with Kei Yasuda and Sayaka Ichii to form the subgroup Petitmoni (also known as Pucchi Moni). Petitmoni's first single, "Chokotto Love", rivaled the success of "Love Machine", selling over 1,123,610 copies.

2000: Koi no Dance Site, continued commercial success and the 4th Generation
"Koi no Dance Site" was released in early 2000, reaching number two and selling over a million copies—400,000 away from reaching "Love Machine"'s success. The single had the highest 1st week sales than any other Morning Musume's singles, an enormous amount of 600,860 copies. Even with this large number, the single did not reach number one because Southern All Stars's biggest hit single, Tsunami, which sold total of 2.93 million copies, was released at the same date as Koi no Dance Site. Aya Ishiguro left the group before the single was released in order to marry Shinya, drummer of visual kei rock band Luna Sea, leaving the group with seven members.

The second event of 2000 was the creation of "shuffle units", in which all members of Tsunku's then 16-member family, Hello! Project, were shuffled around to form three one-time groups: Akagumi 4, Kiiro 5, and Aoiro 7. The idea was to battle for the highest single sales. This was achieved by Akagumi 4 which boasted Maki Goto as the lead vocals.

In March, their third studio album, 3rd: Love Paradise was released. Despite having "Love Machine" and "Koi no Dance Site" on its track list, it did not manage to claim the number one spot, but did sell more than 800,000 copies, making it Morning Musume's highest-selling studio album to date.

This year also brought a new generation search. The fourth generation consisted of Rika Ishikawa, Hitomi Yoshizawa, Nozomi Tsuji, and Ai Kago, lending a completely different feel to the group by adding the 12-year-old duo of Tsuji and Kago. After their debut single, "Happy Summer Wedding", (continuing the legacy of number one hits with 1,370,000 copies sold,) Sayaka Ichii left to pursue her own music career. She became the vocalist of Japanese group Cubic Cross and later married fellow member Naoki Yoshizawa (no relation to Hitomi Yoshizawa).

With Ishiguro and Ichii gone, both Tanpopo and Petitmoni revised their lineups—Hitomi Yoshizawa joined Petitmoni, and Ai Kago and Rika Ishikawa were added to Tanpopo. Meanwhile, Mari Yaguchi had started performing informally with Ai Kago and Nozomi Tsuji in concerts as Mini Moni, a group tailored towards younger audiences with all the members being less than 150 cm (about 5 ft) tall. Mika Todd of Coconuts Musume was later added into the group and Tsunku made them official. Their debut single, "Minimoni Jankenpyon!", was a number one hit on the Oricon.

As an idol group, they were extremely successful, drawing comparisons to the popularity of former girl idol group Speed. "I Wish" and "Renai Revolution 21" (Yuko Nakazawa's last single) continued the trend of happy pop songs becoming staple hits for the group. Morning Musume also began their tradition of performing in musicals each year, breaking new ground as idols with their musical Love Century: Yume wa Minakerya Hajimaranai.

2001: "The Peace" and the 5th Generation
In April 2001, group leader Yuko Nakazawa left to focus on her solo career (stating her age as a factor as well—she felt it was limiting her ability to meet the physical demands of the group's activities) making Kaori Iida and Kei Yasuda Morning Musume's co-leaders. During this time, Rika Ishikawa was "lent" out to the rather inactive group, Country Musume. She did not officially join, but participated as a feature singers in number of their singles.

By July 2001 the string of number one hits had yet to be broken with the release of the single "The Peace!". The Peace! features a distinctive call and response chants, with Rika Ishikawa as the center focus.

British newspaper The Guardian described the promotional video echoed the song's "strangeness" by placing the group in the middle of what appeared to be a gigantic public bathroom, displaying the girls dancing amongst the urinals and posing for photographs in the stalls; supposedly as a response to hidden camera footage of the members that had recently surfaced, filmed from a toilet in their production offices.

At the end of January 2001, the best selling Hello! Project album to date was released: Best! Morning Musume 1. It sold 2,259,510 copies. It featured 15 tracks, the only original song being "Say Yeah! -Motto Miracle Night-".

At the end of 2001, four new members joined the group as the fifth generation through the audition "Love Audition 21:" Ai Takahashi, Asami Konno, Makoto Ogawa, and Risa Niigaki, bringing the roster to 13 girls. Their first single "Mr. Moonlight: Ai no Big Band", (done in the style of big band) featured fourth generation member Hitomi Yoshizawa as the central focus and main vocalist of the song.

2002 : Maki Goto's departure and massive re-structuring of the sub-units
In February, "Sōda! We're Alive", another hit, was released. It featured many different styles combined into one song, centered on Mari Yaguchi.

In July 2002, "Do It! Now" was released. This single finally broke the line of number one hits and came in at number three—a surprising fact to many, considering it was Maki Goto's last single.

Morning Musume's fourth studio album, 4th Ikimasshoi! was released in March 2002 after a two-year wait. It is the first studio album from the group to reach number one on Oricon. It featured the singles "Renai Revolution 21", (rerecorded with the current 13-person formation,) "The Peace!", (in a 'full', longer version,) "Mr. Moonlight: Ai no Big Band", (with added dialog at the beginning,) and "Sōda! We're Alive".

Late 2002 was marked by the graduation of Maki Goto and a mass re-shuffle of the sub-units. Tsunku removed Kaori Iida, Mari Yaguchi, and Ai Kago from Tanpopo, adding in Asami Konno, Risa Niigaki, and Ayumi Shibata of Melon Kinenbi to join Rika Ishikawa. Tanpopo only released one single with this lineup before the group was put on an indefinite hiatus status. Makoto Ogawa and Ayaka Kimura of Coconuts Musume joined Hitomi Yoshizawa in Petitmoni to replace Kei Yasuda and Maki Goto, but the group did not even release a single, only performing in concerts. Their song "Wow Wow Wow" was later released on the Hello! Project's compilation CD Petit Best 4. In Mini Moni, Mari Yaguchi was replaced by Ai Takahashi and the new lineup went on to put out several singles and a second album until member Mika Todd left in May 2004, adding Mini Moni to the list of "indefinite hiatus" subgroups.

In October "Koko ni Iruzee!" was released, a fast-paced, feel-good song about making the most of life and music's ability to unite the world. It was number one on Oricon.

2003: 6th Generation debut and sub-groups
The unique childlike tune "Morning Musume no Hyokkori Hyōtanjima" was released in February 2003 as the group's seventeenth single. It is significant because it was a cover song, marking the first time Tsunku did not write a single's lyrics.

April brought the notably successful single "As for One Day"—a synthesizer-driven song about lost love—which sold 129,893 copies and hit number one in Oricon charts, and was the last time a Morning Musume single hit number one until "Aruiteru" (released late 2006). This single was the last for Kei Yasuda.

Before the auditions for the sixth generation were held, the group released the album No. 5. It was unique in a few ways. It was the last studio album to feature Kei Yasuda and Natsumi Abe as full members of the group. It was also the first Morning Musume studio album to feature a former member, as Maki Goto guests on "Megami (Mousse na Yasashisa)" and "Ganbacchae!". It only featured two singles: "Do It! Now" and "Koko ni Iruzee!".

In mid-2003, four new girls were added as the sixth generation: Miki Fujimoto, Eri Kamei, Sayumi Michishige, and Reina Tanaka. Eri Kamei, Sayumi Michishige, and Reina Tanaka successfully passed the traditional auditions; however, Miki Fujimoto was a solo singer in Hello!Project at the time. After appearing on the New Year's music program "Kōhaku Uta Gassen" with several Morning Musume members dancing as backup, Tsunku added her as part of the sixth generation.

The sixth generation's first single was "Shabondama", which featured "break-up" lyrics, a seemingly spontaneous dance routine, and rolled "r"s.

Mari Yaguchi became Morning Musume's sub-leader after Kei's departure and was also put in charge of training and assisting the trainee group of Hello! Project Kids, eventually forming a group with five of them, known as ZYX.

Later in 2003, Morning Musume was split into two subgroups so that it could tour more cities (especially smaller cities that could not support a 15-member troupe). Morning Musume Sakuragumi, which focused on slower and more traditional love songs, included Natsumi Abe, Mari Yaguchi, Hitomi Yoshizawa, Ai Kago, Ai Takahashi, Risa Niigaki, Asami Konno and Eri Kamei. Morning Musume Otomegumi, which had more upbeat pop songs with a slight rock flavor, featured Kaori Iida, Rika Ishikawa, Nozomi Tsuji, Makoto Ogawa, Miki Fujimoto, Sayumi Michishige, and Reina Tanaka. Sakuragumi released two singles: "Hare Ame Nochi Suki" and "Sakura Mankai", and Otomegumi released two singles as well: "Ai no Sono: Touch My Heart!" and "Yūjō: Kokoro no Busu ni wa Naranee!".

The last single of Morning Musume in 2003 to feature the entire group was "Go Girl: Koi no Victory", which had the members girlishly proclaiming the victory of their love.

2004: Nozomi Tsuji and Ai Kago's graduation 
In January 2004, Natsumi Abe (known as "the face of Morning Musume" to the general public) left to pursue a soloist career. Her last single was "Ai Araba It's All Right", Morning Musume's last song to sell more than 100,000 copies until 'One Two Three / The Matenrou Show'. "Ai Araba It's All Right" had uplifting lyrics and a cheery dance sequence.

The group soon released another single, "Roman: My Dear Boy". The song showcased an almost rock flavor and centered its lyrics around offering "a dance" to a boy. This was followed by their twenty-third single, "Joshi Kashimashi Monogatari", which is unique in that it was actually about the Morning Musume girls themselves—each member got a verse about their personality. This song would later be remade several times as "Joshi Kashimashi Monogatari 2" and "Joshi Kashimashi Monogatari 3", included in their sixth and seventh album respectively. This single also marked the leaving of fourth-generation members Nozomi Tsuji and Ai Kago in August, to focus on "W", their new duo group.

In April 2004, Rika Ishikawa was caught in a rare scandal, as an audio recording revealed her saying of the group's fans at a show, "look at them. Grownups screaming like that! I can't believe it. So stupid!" 

In mid-2004, Morning Musume's second best-of album, Best! Morning Musume 2 was released and featured "Yah! Aishitai" as the only new track. It had a lukewarm reception at best, compared to their first best-of compilation.

Auditions for the seventh generation (named "Lucky 7" to commemorate the seventh generation, the seventh year of Morning Musume, and seven audition sites across Japan) were held in various Japan cities in late 2004, resulting in six finalists. However, on January 9, 2005, Tsunku surprised everyone by announcing that no one in the Lucky 7 audition would be added to Morning Musume, citing that he had set his expectations extra-high this year in hopes of finding an "ace". This was the first time an audition had ended with no new members.

In November 2004, Morning Musume released "Namida ga Tomaranai Hōkago", a ballad that featured Asami Konno, Miki Fujimoto, Sayumi Michishige, and Rika Ishikawa.

Following this single Morning Musume Early Single Box was released. It was a 9-CD set containing their first eight singles with a bonus track on each one, as well as a karaoke CD of some of their more popular tunes from the early years.

Finally, at the end of 2004, the group's yearly album was released. Their sixth studio album, named Ai no Dai 6 Kan, hit stores in December. It contained three singles: "Roman: My Dear Boy", "Joshi Kashimashi Monogatari", and "Namida ga Tomaranai Hōkago". This was Ai Kago, Nozomi Tsuji, Kaori Iida, Mari Yaguchi, and Rika Ishikawa's last credited studio album.

2005: 7th Generation "Miracle" Member
On January 30, 2005, then-leader and the last member from the first generation Kaori Iida left to pursue a solo singer/artist career, with Mari Yaguchi taking on leadership role with Hitomi Yoshizawa as subleader. Her last single was "The Manpower!!!", which sung about the abilities of the human race and was also the Tohoku Rakuten Golden Eagles theme song. The beginning of 2005 also saw the beginning of Musume Document 2005, which covered behind-the-scenes material, historical footage, and interviews.

In February 2005, Tsunku started another audition for Morning Musume's seventh generation. He noted that he was still intent on finding an "ace". This audition resulted with Koharu Kusumi finally being chosen as the sole "miracle" member of the new generation.

On April 10, 2005, photos were taken of Mari Yaguchi with Shun Oguri (scheduled to be published in a gossip magazine Friday! on the 15th). On April 14, 2005, Yaguchi announced that she would "retire" from Morning Musume and would continue on with solo activities. In her public statement, Yaguchi said that due to the scandal and its publicity, she could no longer sustain an "idol" image befitting of Morning Musume. Because of the nature of her departure, Yaguchi did not receive a leaving concert. Sub-leader Hitomi Yoshizawa took over as the leader of Morning Musume, and Miki Fujimoto became sub-leader as of July 15, 2005.

Just days after Yaguchi resigned, on April 27, 2005, the group's twenty-sixth single, "Osaka Koi no Uta" was released. The final version featured Yaguchi still, presumably because they did not have enough time to rerecord and remix it. The lyrics are in an Osaka dialect. This single was also Rika Ishikawa's last. She left on May 7, 2005, to assume full-time leadership of the Hello! Project trio known as v-u-den.

Kusumi's first single with Morning Musume was July's "Iroppoi Jirettai", a flamenco styled song, which was considered to be the biggest hit of the year—selling around 20,000 more copies than anything else. A 3 city handshake event was organized for the promotion of this single.

Morning Musume's last single of 2005 was "Chokkan 2: Nogashita Sakana wa Ōkiizo!", which was a remake of a previous album-only song about the importance of using your intuition and not taking good things for granted. "Koi wa Hassō Do The Hustle!" was going to be the title track for the single, but due to poor preview results, became the coupling track instead.

On December 31, 2005, former Morning Musume members Mari Yaguchi, Kaori Iida, Natsumi Abe, Yuko Nakazawa, Ai Kago, Nozomi Tsuji, Rika Ishikawa, Maki Goto, and Kei Yasuda joined the current lineup of Morning Musume to perform the group's signature hit "Love Machine" on the 2005/2006 edition of Kōhaku Uta Gassen. The performance was Yaguchi's first since leaving Morning Musume eight and a half months earlier.

2006: Asami Konno and Makoto Ogawa's graduation
On January 16, 2006, it was announced that Morning Musume had won a Kanagawa Image Up Award in recognition of Hello! Project's support of an anti-pollution campaign. Yoshizawa, Fujimoto, and Takahashi represented the group to accept the award.

In February, the group released their seventh studio album, Rainbow 7. It was the first album for Kusumi and the last for Konno and Ogawa. The album features "The Manpower!!!", "Osaka Koi no Uta", "Iroppoi Jirettai", and "Chokkan 2: Nogashita Sakana wa Ōkiizo!" (in a remixed form). Kaori Iida, Rika Ishikawa and Mari Yaguchi are not credited anywhere in the liner notes although their vocals appear. Three of the songs on the album are performed by smaller clusters of several group members, and are credited in the liner notes to the featured members involved, rather than to the entire group.

In March 2006, "Sexy Boy: Soyokaze ni Yorisotte" was released. It featured an easy-to-learn dance and a parapara style. It was considered to be a relative success.

On April 28, 2006, it was announced by Tsunku from his official website that fifth-generation members Asami Konno and Makoto Ogawa would be leaving the group. Konno graduated on July 23, 2006, to attend University and Ogawa left on August 27, 2006, to study English abroad. Both left Morning Musume, but only Konno left Hello! Project entirely; Ogawa intended to return after completing her studies. However, as of 2007, Konno returned to Hello! Project to join the new group Ongaku Gatas, making it the first time ever that a girl who left Hello! Project actually returned. Ogawa, on the other hand, returned in June 2008 by appearing on an episode of Morning Musume's television show Haromoni@.

Konno and Ogawa's last single was "Ambitious! Yashinteki de Ii Jan", which, yet again, featured a parapara type arrangement, with a rock 'n' roll flair. It was the group's 30th single, and a limited-edition CD of all past 30 singles mixed into a thirteen-minute track was included on the first pressing. Unfortunately, sales did not meet the hype, and Ambitious! clocked in as Morning Musume's lowest-selling single yet.

In mid-2006, the group performed the musical Ribbon no Kishi. Ai Takahashi took the main role; the secondary role was played by alternating members. There was also a mini-concert at the end of each performance, which served as Ogawa's real "leaving concert"—the Wonderful Hearts 2006 concert was initially intended for Konno's departure only, although Ogawa wore a special outfit and read her leaving comments as well. As for Ribbon no Kishi, an album with a selection of songs was released: Ribbon no Kishi The Musical Song Selection.

In mid-2006, Tsunku announced the audition for the eighth generation, called Morning Musume Happy 8 Audition. The audition started on August 27, 2006, and ended in Tokyo on October 22, 2006. On December 10, 2006's Hello! Morning, it was announced that the only new member was Aika Mitsui. The show had a piece of audition footage each week leading up to December 10, 2006.

The last single release in 2006 was "Aruiteru", which was a huge hit. It was the first single at the number one spot after 3½ years (their last number one hit being "As for One Day".) The song's lyrics were credited for its success, with lines like "walking, you're not alone because everyone's here with you, praying for peace". It was a bit of a turn from the hyperactive singles the group had been releasing. Tsunku's group, Sharan Q, also made a rock cover of this song.

Their first mini-album, 7.5 Fuyu Fuyu Morning Musume Mini!, was released in December. It featured five tracks by solo and/or smaller combinations of group members. It also featured the single "Aruiteru".

2007: 8th Generation debut, Hitomi Yoshizawa's graduation, and Miki Fujimoto's dismissal
In early 2007, Morning Musume Tanjō 10nen Kinentai, a unit consisting of Kaori Iida, Natsumi Abe, Maki Goto, Risa Niigaki, and Koharu Kusumi, was created to celebrate the 10th anniversary of Morning Musume. They released a commemorative single called "Bokura ga Ikiru My Asia". The members chosen symbolize the beginning of the group; how they had five members ranging in age from 14 to 24. Additionally, each member was from an odd-numbered generation (Kaori Iida and Natsumi Abe from the first generation, Maki Goto from the third, Risa Niigaki from the fifth, and Koharu Kusumi from the seventh).

On January 2, 2007, an announcement was made during Hello! Project's 2007 Winter concert that the group's leader at the time Hitomi Yoshizawa would leave Morning Musume on May 6, 2007, the last day of Morning Musume's 2007 spring tour. The concert would take place at the Saitama Super Arena in Yoshizawa's hometown.

In February, the first single with the eighth generation member Aika Mitsui was released, "Egao Yes Nude". This was the first PV of Morning Musume to appear on the Dohhh!Up site (a streaming website of Hello! Project media). The single went up against tougher competition than "Aruiteru" had, only landing them a number four spot, although it sold relatively the same number of copies. The song has a funky, disco feel, and is highly reminiscent of some of the older songs of Morning Musume, most notably Summer Night Town.

On the March 11, 2007, edition of the weekly TV show Hello! Morning, producer Tsunku revealed he would make an important announcement in the following episode. Several days later, on March 15, he announced that two other eighth generation members would be joining the group—Li Chun and Qian Lin, both Chinese nationals, were to join as "exchange students". Tsunku stated the two new members would be an important key for their group's planned expansion into Asia and gave them the stage names "Jun Jun" and "Lin Lin" respectively. The two made their stage debut on May 6, at Saitama Super Arena. They were the first non-Japanese members of the group.

On March 21, 2007, the group's eighth studio album, Sexy 8 Beat, was released. It was the first album for Aika Mitsui and the last album for Hitomi Yoshizawa and Miki Fujimoto. It featured the singles "Aruiteru", "Egao Yes Nude", "Sexy Boy: Soyokaze ni Yorisotte", and "Ambitious! Yashinteki de Ii Jan".

On April 25, 2007, Morning Musume released their 33rd single, "Kanashimi Twilight". The song style was a huge departure from almost anything Morning Musume had released prior to it, displaying a loud, rock arrangement and the angriest lyrics since Shabondama. This would be the group's last single with members Hitomi Yoshizawa and Miki Fujimoto.

With the success of Kanashimi Twilight, on May 1, 2007, Morning Musume became the "best single selling female group in Japan" with 11,085,000 copies sold—their fifth Oricon record. The achievement surpasses the previous record set by Pink Lady of 11,037,000 copies sold.

On May 6, 2007, Hitomi Yoshizawa left. Miki Fujimoto took her place as leader and Ai Takahashi replaced Fujimoto as sub-leader.

As of June 1, 2007, Miki Fujimoto resigned from Morning Musume, due to the tabloid magazine Friday running an article depicting Fujimoto and comedian Tomoharu Shoji in a relationship. Ai Takahashi replaced Fujimoto as leader (a position the latter occupied for the briefest period in the group's history—26 days), and Risa Niigaki became subleader.

Morning Musume's 34th single, "Onna ni Sachi Are", a song with a beatmania style was released on July 25, 2007. It features the debut of new eighth generation members from China, Jun Jun and Lin Lin. The single reached number two on the Oricon Weekly Singles Chart, with sales of 43,364 copies.

On October 26, 2007, Ai Takahashi, Risa Niigaki, and Koharu Kusumi visited Korea to promote their singles collection album Morning Musume All Singles Complete: 10th Anniversary, which was released on October 24, 2007. Also, Takahashi and Niigaki appeared as special guests in a Korean radio show called Maybee's Turn Up the Volume (메이비의 볼륨을 높여요). Later that same month, on October 29, 2007, all nine members traveled to Taiwan for three days to promote the album. This was the first time Morning Musume held a non-Fan Club promotional event as a group outside Japan. During their visit, they attended press conferences, appeared for radio and TV show recordings, and held the first-ever public handshaking event outside Japan.

November 21, 2007, marked the release of Morning Musume's 35th single, "Mikan". Initial sales were poor for the song. It became the group's lowest-selling single (even lower than the initial indies release of "Ai no Tane", which sold 50,000 copies), both in terms of first week sales and absolute sales figures. As a result, unlike all previous singles, Mikan failed to appear on Oricon's Top 5 Chart, breaking the group's previously held record.

On December 31, 2007, Morning Musume performed in the 58th NHK Kōhaku Uta Gassen with a remixed version of their song "Love Machine" along with Cute and Berryz Kobo. Similar to the previous Kōhaku, the red team (females) lost to the white team (males) after attaining votes from the viewers and judges.

2008–2010: Platinum Era and stable line-up 
Ai Takahashi, Eri Kamei, Sayumi Michishige, and Reina Tanaka participated in the musical Ojigi 30 Degrees at the Shinjuku Theater from February 26 to March 2. Morning Musume's 36th music single, "Resonant Blue", had been announced for release on March 5, 2008, but was postponed until April 16, 2008, because of the busy schedule in the winter/early spring season. Multiple promotional videos were released. With the original, another version, a studio dance shot version, a night scene version, and a one-cut dance version, it makes the most PVs ever released for one single. Also notable is the smoky eye make-up used on the members, a daring new look for Morning Musume as they attempt to expand into Asia.

The management of Morning Musume revealed in an interview in March that they were going to take a new approach to promoting the group, pushing the individual members so that they could do more personal work and become more well known, as was the case in the first line-up of the group.

On April 5, 2008, Morning Musume's Aika Mitsui complained of a stomach ache after a concert at Hachiōji Citizen Hall. She was diagnosed with acute appendicitis and was ordered to rest for two weeks. Mitsui subsequently missed the concerts on April 12 and 13.

"Resonant Blue", the 36th single, was released on April 16, 2008, after being delayed due to hectic schedules. The single debuted at number two and finished third in the Oricon Weekly ranking. Overall, the single marked a rebound from poor sales of the previous single, "Mikan". In its first week, it sold 48,086 copies, 20,004 copies more than "Mikan" and around 5,000 more copies than Onna ni Sachi Are.

The group held a concert at Taipei Nankang Exhibition Hall, Taiwan, on May 24, 2008. the first time ever for Morning Musume to have a concert outside Japan.

From August 6 to 25, 2008, Morning Musume performed with several members of the all-female Takarazuka theater troupe in a version of Rodgers and Hammerstein's Cinderella. Ai Takahashi starred in the main role of Cinderella, with Risa Niigaki as the Prince, and Eri Kamei and Reina Tanaka as the stepsisters. The other members performed in minor roles as fairies and guards.

Morning Musume's 37th single, "Pepper Keibu", was released on September 24, 2008. Unlike past singles (with the exception of Morning Musume no Hyokkori Hyōtanjima), this song is a cover. It is originally known as Pink Lady's debut single, released in 1976. In the first week of the release, it sold approximately 10,000 copies less than Resonant Blue and 10,000 copies more than Mikan.

The show starred Morning Musume, Berryz Kobo, and Cute.

2008 was the first year in which there were no changes in Morning Musume's lineup.

Morning Musume released their 38th single on February 18, 2009. This was their first single of 2009, titled "Naichau Kamo". The title translates to "I Might Cry" and was released in two limited versions, A and B, each including a DVD. On March 18, 2009, they released their ninth studio album, called Platinum 9 Disc.

Morning Musume released their 39th single, "Shōganai Yume Oibito", on May 13, 2009, attaining a rank of number one on the Oricon weekly chart for the first time since their "Aruiteru" single in late 2006. It also became the group's first number one single to feature eighth generation members Aika Mitsui, Jun Jun, and Lin Lin.

Following the success of "Shōganai Yume Oibito", the group released their 40th single, "Nanchatte Renai", on August 12. Because "Nanchatte Renai" was the group's 40th single, a commemorative edition was released along with the usual regular edition plus two limited editions. The commemorative edition has a different c/w track on it than the regular and limited editions. The group hadn't had two different c/ws since their 4th single, "Memory Seishun no Hikari" in 1999, which has two c/w tracks in one edition. The single came in at number two on the Oricon chart, only behind the new single of powerhouse Ayumi Hamasaki, Sunrise/Sunset (Love Is All). This single marked their best opening week since "Iroppoi Jirettai" in 2005.

Their latest Greatest Hits Album (B-side collection album) was released featuring all B-side songs from their debut single to 40th single on 3 discs.

Morning Musume released their 41st single, "Kimagure Princess", on October 28, 2009. There are four versions of the single (Regular, Limited A, B, and C). This marked the first time a Morning Musume single released a C version. The C version contained 10 interchangeable covers, much like 30th single "Ambitious! Yashinteki de Ii Jan", which came with 10 different covers.

The announcement was made that 7th Generation member Koharu Kusumi would leave Morning Musume and Hello! Project on December 6, after the first performance of Morning Musume's Fall Concert Tour 2009 Nine Smile, in order to pursue a modelling career. This was the first departure since fourth-generation member Hitomi Yoshizawa in 2007, ending the longest stable line-up for Morning Musume.

Morning Musume released their 42nd single, "Onna ga Medatte Naze Ikenai", on February 10, 2010 It was released in four versions: Regular, and Limited A, B, and C. This was the group's first single released with the new eight-member lineup, following the departure of seventh generation member Koharu Kusumi. Their tenth album, 10 My Me, was released on March 17. Their forty-third single, "Seishun Collection", was released on June 9.

On August 8, producer Tsunku announced at that day's concert, and later on his blog, that sixth-generation member Eri Kamei and eighth generation members Jun Jun and Lin Lin would be leaving Morning Musume at the end of the autumn tour, and that the ninth-generation audition would be held later in the year. The triple departure left Morning Musume temporarily at five members for the first time since its creation. Kamei stated that the reason for her leaving was to spend more time on the treatment of her atopic dermatitis, a chronic form of eczema, while Jun Jun and Lin Lin left to pursue careers in China.

Morning Musume's 44th single, "Onna to Otoko no Lullaby Game", was released on November 24, and Morning Musume's eleventh studio album, Fantasy! Jūichi, was released on December 1. These were the last single and album to feature Kamei, Jun Jun and Lin Lin and the album contains only two singles. On December 15, the last day of the autumn tour, Eri Kamei, Jun Jun and Lin Lin left Morning Musume and Hello! Project.

In 2010, it was announced that a new group has been created, "Dream Morning Musume", consisting of former-Morning Musume members:
Yuko Nakazawa, Kaori Iida, Natsumi Abe, Kei Yasuda, Mari Yaguchi, Rika Ishikawa, Hitomi Yoshizawa, Makoto Ogawa, Miki Fujimoto, Koharu Kusumi. They released an album titled DoriMusu 1 which consisted of two new songs, as well as remakes of older Morning Musume songs.

2011: Revival and 9th and 10th Generation debuts 
The three audition winners, Riho Sayashi, Kanon Suzuki and Erina Ikuta, were announced on stage by Tsunku at the Hello! Project 2011 Winter: Kangei Shinsen Matsuri concert on January 2, 2011. He then announced that Mizuki Fukumura, a Hello! Pro Egg, would also be joining Morning Musume.

On January 9, also at the Winter concert, it was announced that leader Ai Takahashi would be leaving Morning Musume and Hello! Project at the group's Autumn 2011 concert. The decision came after Tsunku suggested that Takahashi should consider leaving soon. After Takahashi's departure, Risa Niigaki took over her role as leader but for the first time, there was no subleader. Takahashi continued her musical and theatre careers after leaving.

On February 3, 2011, Morning Musume's 45th single, "Maji Desu ka Ska!", was announced. The single was set to be released on March 23, 2011; however, due to the earthquake and tsunami in Japan, the single was postponed until April 6. The new single reached number 5 on the Oricon weekly charts.

Morning Musume 46th single, "Only You", was released on June 15, 2011. There were five versions to the single: Regular, Limited A, Limited B, Limited C, and Limited D. The single reached number 4 on the Oricon Weekly charts.

On April 13, Morning Musume launched a weekly 1-hour Ustream show called UstreaMusume. On their official website, there is an e-mail provided, so fans can submit questions, messages and requests.

It was announced May 8 that 10th Generation Audition "Genkijirushi" submissions were starting until June 13.

During the summer, Morning Musume did a Fanclub Tour in Hawaii from July 20–26.

On September 14, Morning Musume released their 47th single. This was the leader Ai Takahashi's last single with Morning Musume after a tenure of 10 years with the group. In order to celebrate Ai Takahashi's long career with Morning Musume, their 47th single was released as a double A sides. This is the first time in history that Morning Musume has purposely done a double A side single. There were five versions of the single: Regular, Limited A, Limited B, Limited C and Limited D. The single names were as follows: "Kono Chikyū no Heiwa o Honki de Negatterun Da yo! / Kare to Issho ni Omise ga Shitai!" as the double A side and Takahashi's solo song was revealed as "Jishin Motte Yume o Motte Tobitatsu Kara". The 47th single reached number 2 on the Oricon daily and weekly charts.

On September 29, the penultimate day of the fall tour and the day before Ai Takahashi's departure, Tsunku announced the four winners of the tenth-generation audition, Haruna Iikubo, Ayumi Ishida, Masaki Sato, and Haruka Kudo from Hello! Pro Egg. This brings the group to 12 members, excluding Ai Takahashi, which is the highest number of group members since late-2004 and early-2005 before Iida Kaori's departure. On September 30, Takahashi left, handing over her position as leader of Morning Musume and Hello! Project to Risa Niigaki.

2012–2014: Colorful era 
It was announced on January 2 that new leader Risa Niigaki would leave Morning Musume and Hello! Project on the last day of their spring concert tour, May 18, at the Nippon Budokan. The tour started on February 19. Niigaki's successor was not announced, but Sayumi Michishige had expressed her desire to be the next leader.

Morning Musume's 49th single, "Renai Hunter", was released on April 11, 2012. This was Risa Niigaki's last single in Morning Musume and it came in Limited A, B, C, and D editions and also had a solo cover song by Risa called Egao Ni Namida, originally sung by Matsuura Aya. It was also the last single to feature Aika Mitsui.

On May 4, Aika Mitsui announced that she would leave Morning Musume, due to an unhealed stress fracture in her left foot. She left along with Niigaki at Nippon Budokan on May 18. Sayumi Michishige was declared as the new leader at the concert, along with the announcement of the 11th generation 'Suppin Utahime' audition.

On July 4, Morning Musume's 50th single, "One Two Three / The Matenrou Show" was released, and sold 56,139 copies on its first day, charting at number 2. These first-day sales surpassed the first week sales of all Morning Musume singles since 'Iroppoi Jirettai' in 2005. The single came in seven different editions: Regular, Limited A and Limited B (featuring sixth-generation), Limited C and D (featuring ninth-generation) and Limited E and Limited F (featuring tenth-generation). The Limited A, B, C, D, E and F had tracks featuring the respective generations.

"One Two Three/The Matenrou Show" placed at number 3 weekly, selling over 100,000 copies in its first week, thus becoming the group's first single since "Koko ni Iruzee!" (released in 2002) to sell over 100,000 units in its first week, as well as first single since "Ai Araba It's All Right" (2004) to sell over 100,000 units total and receive a gold certification. This also became the group's 50th top-ten single, breaking their own previous record of 49 singles and becoming the first artist to do so.

Morning Musume's 13th album, 13 Colorful Character, was released on September 12.

On September 14, 2012, at Morning Musume's 15th Anniversary Concert Tour Rehearsal, Hello! Project producer Tsunku, announced the winner of the 'Morning Musume 11th Generation Suppin Utahime Auditions'. Sakura Oda was chosen out of 7,000 applicants and was the only one out of the six finalists to be chosen making her the third sole generation of Morning Musume, previously being Maki Goto (third-generation) and Koharu Kusumi (seventh-generation).

Morning Musume's 52nd single would be called "Help me!!" was released on January 23, 2013, and was the first single to feature eleventh-generation member Sakura Oda. It was Morning Musume's first single since "Shouganai Yume Oibito" in 2009 to achieve the weekly number 1 spot on the Oricon charts. On February 28, a loose shot version of a new song titled "Brainstorming" was posted onto YouTube, a few days later a dance shot version of another new song titled "Kimi Sae Ireba Nani mo Iranai" was also posted. It was then confirmed that both tracks would be released as a double A-side single on April 17.

On March 16, Tsunku announced the twelfth-generation audition, called  'Morning Musume Mirai Shoujo audition'. On August 4, he announced that no one had passed the audition. He stated that this was partly due to the level of talent being lower than necessary, and partly due to the recent success of the current line-up. All audition finalists were accepted into the Hello!Project Kenshuusei program.

On May 21, Reina Tanaka graduated from Morning Musume after the final live of the “Morning Musume Concert Tour 2013"

On January 1, Morning Musume began the new year with their new group name, Morning Musume '14. On January 21, Tsunku announced at the au Presentation Spring 2014 that Morning Musume would be part of a commercial along with comedians Morisanchuu, forming a new unit called Morimusu. On January 29, Morning Musume '14 released their 55th single, "Egao no Kimi wa Taiyo sa / Kimi no Kawari wa Iyashinai / What is Love?". This was their first single released as Morning Musume '14. The single peaked at number 1 on the Oricon charts, becoming their fourth number 1 single in a row – the longest streak of number ones in the group's history. In February, Morning Musume cheered and sang an official song produced by Tsunku, titled "Kimi no Kawari wa Iyashinai", for the 2014 Sochi Olympics Japanese Team.

On April 16, Morning Musume '14 released their 56th single, "Toki o Koe Sora wo Koe / Password is 0", which also peaked at number 1 on the Oricon weekly chart. On April 29, during the Morning Musume '14 Concert Tour Haru: Evolution concert held in Yamaguchi, Sayumi Michishige announced that she would be leaving the group at their fall 2014 concert tour. On August 16, it was announced that the last date of the tour would take place on November 26, 2014, at Yokohama Arena.

The 12th-generation members were officially revealed on September 30. They were Haruna Ogata, Miki Nonaka, Maria Makino, and Akane Haga.

On October 15, Morning Musume '14 released their 57th single, "Tiki Bun / Shabadaba Dū / Mikaeri Bijin". It was the final single featuring sixth-generation member Sayumi Michishige. On November 26, Michishige left Morning Musume during the concert "Aki Give Me More Love: Michishige Sayumi Sotsugyo Kinen Special". With Michishige's graduation, there are no members in the group who have been member at the same time as a 1st generation member. Mizuki Fukumura was appointed new leader and Erina Ikuta joined Haruna Iikubo as sub-leader.

2015–2016: Riho Sayashi and Kanon Suzuki's graduation and 13th Generation 
On January 1, 2015, Morning Musume '14 changed their name to Morning Musume '15. Haruna Iikubo, Ayumi Ishida, and Sakura Oda provide their voices in the movie for the role of a trio of spirits that they designed themselves. On February 14, 2015, it was announced that Haruna Iikubo would be the official mentor to the 12th generation, bringing back the mentor system.. On October 29, 2015, it was announced by UP-FRONT PROMOTION that Sayashi Riho will be graduated from Morning Musume '15 on December 31, 2015, during the countdown live, in order to focus on dancing. In October 2015, YouTube blocked UP-FRONT GROUP Co., Ltd.'s videos and related videos in many Western countries including the United States due to YouTube Red contract issues. (Up-Front Group is the holdings company involved in Hello Project and Morning Musume.) The issue was later resolved when Up-Front worked out a solution with YouTube.

Morning Musume ’15 released their new single "Tsumetai Kaze to Katamoi / Endless SKy / One and Only" on December 29, 2015. It is a triple A-side single and was Riho's last single as a member of Morning Musume ’15. "One and Only" was the first Morning Musume song to be sung completely in English.

On January 1, 2016, Morning Musume '15 was renamed Morning Musume '16. On January 2, Morning Musume '16 Shinseiki Audition was announced during the Hello! Project 2016 Winter ~Dancing! Singing! Exciting!~ concert, to look for the 13th Generation members. In March, Morning Musume had their first concert with the new name. On February 7, Kanon Suzuki announced she will graduate from Morning Musume '16 and Hello! Project at the end of the Morning Musume '16  Spring Concert Tour Haru ~Emotion in Motion~. On February 26 to 28, 2016, Morning Musume '16 were main guests at Anime Matsuri in Houston, Texas to celebrate the convention's 10th anniversary. Morning Musume '16 released their 61st single "Utakata Saturday Night! / The Vision / Tokyo to Iu Katasumi". It is Kanon Suzuki's last single as a member of Morning Musume. On May 31, Kanon Suzuki graduated at the end of the spring concert tour in Nippon Budokan. On May 31, it was announced that no one had passed the Shinseiki audition, but as announced on June 15, 2016, it was re-held. Morning Musume '16 was invited to perform during the TV Tokyo Music Festival(3) on June 29, and NTV's THE MUSIC DAY Natsu no Hajimari on July 2, TBS TV's Ongaki no Hi x CDTV Asamade Natsu Fes! 2016 on July 16 and Fuji TV's 2016 FNS Uta no Natsu Matsuri on July 18 with °C-ute and Angerme.

On November 23, Morning Musume '16 released their 62nd single, Sexy Cat no Enzetsu / Mukidashi de Mukiatte / Sou Janai. Morning Musume '16 appeared during the second night of Fuji TV's 2016 FNS Kayousai on December 14, performing in an "Idol Shuffle Medley" with other idol groups including °C-ute.

On November 23 at the Morning Musume '16 Concert Tour Aki "My Vision" concert in Osaka, the group announced that the 13th generation would be selected from Hello Pro Kenshuusei and announced at the Nippon Budokan tour finale on December 12. The audition administrator later released an official statement on the Hello! Project website explaining that the winner(s) would be chosen from Hello Pro Kenshuusei because, once again, no suitable candidates were found from the general audition. The 13th Generation members were officially revealed on December 12. They are two former Hello!Pro Kenshuusei members Kaede Kaga and Reina Yokoyama. The 13th Generation was the first in the group's history to have only two members.

On December 31, the group performed on TV for the first time as the Morning Musume '17 line-up during the CDTV Special! Toshikoshi Premier Live 2016→2017. The performance was pre-recorded on December 30, with Sato Masaki unable to participate due to her lower back injury.

2017: 20th Anniversary celebrations, 14th Generation and Haruka Kudo's graduation  
On January 1, 2017, Morning Musume '16 changed their name to Morning Musume '17.

On January 6, Hello!Project announced that Sato Masaki would be on hiatus until further notice as she recovers from her back injury, classed as spinal disc herniation.

On January 12, it was announced that Morning Musume '17 would collaborate with Marukome by singing a remake of "Morning Coffee" titled "Morning Misoshiru" to promote the company's new miso soup product of the same name. it was also announced that Haruka Kudo would be the official mentor to the 13th generation.

Morning Musume '17 formed a collaborative unit with HKT48 member Rino Sashihara named Sashining Musume. They sang the track "Get you!" released in Type-A of AKB48's 8th album Thumbnail (album) on January 25. This is the first AKB single to include Morning Musume, and the first collaboration in a single between the two groups. 'Get You!' would later be included in Morning Musume's 63rd single as a B-side.

On January 26 it was announced that Morning Musume '17 would release their 63rd single titled "Brand New Morning / Jealousy Jealousy" on March 8, 2017. This was the first single to feature the 13th generation members, and the first to not feature 10th generation member Sato Masaki in the A-side tracks while she was on hiatus due to her lower back injury. This single also marks the return of Double A-side's, last seen in their 56th single.

On February 24, Up Front announced that Sato Masaki will be returning from her three-month hiatus, and restart her activities in the group on March 18, where the group had a concert in Pacifico Yokohama during the "Morning Musume'17 Concert Tour Spring "The Inspiration" tour.

On March 25, it was announced that Morning Musume '17 and ANGERME would be featured in the game app titled Hello! Project Hina Fest "Idol Nama Gassen" "Kunitori Tenka Touitsu Hen", for which a "live battle" event was held on April 16.

On April 10, Morning Musume '17 was appointed the official Ouen Taishi, or Cheer Ambassadors, of the "Ceka Paka Play Dream Campaign" for the Nihon Seimei Ce-Pa Koryusen (the Nippon Professional Baseball interleague) that would begin on May 30. Fukumura Mizuki would be the leader of the whole campaign while the other 12 members would each support one of the 12 teams, and each member would have their own type of dance movie that would be shown at their team's home stadium.

On April 29, during the daytime show of Morning Musume '17 Concert Tour Haru "The Inspiration!", 10th generation member Kudo Haruka made a sudden announcement that she will be graduating from Morning Musume '17 and Hello! Project at the end of their fall 2017 tour.

As part of their collaboration with marukome, Morning Musume '17 began airing a weekly 5-minute radio program titled marukome Morning Misoshiru Koeru yo! on July 1 across 38 stations.

On June 26, it was announced through a special episode of Hello! Project Station that Chisaki Morito has joined the group as a new 14th generation member and concurrent member from Country Girls, She began activities with the group in the Hello! Project 2017 SUMMER concert tour and in their upcoming fall tour.

On October 4, they released Morito Chisaki's debut single and Kudo Haruka's last, titled "Jama Shinai de Here We Go! / Dokyuu no Go Sign / Wakain da shi!".

2018–2019: Haruna Ogata's and Haruna Iikubo's graduations and 15th Generation 
On January 1, 2018, Morning Musume '17 changed their name to Morning Musume '18.

On January 28, Morning Musume '18 released the digital single "Hana ga Saku Taiyou Abite".

From February 3 to March 4, the "Morning Musume museum -Morning Musume Tanjou 20 Shuunen Kinen-" was open at HMV and Books Hakata in Fukuoka. Afterwards, it was open from March 11 to April 15 at HMV Sendai in Miyagi. Created to celebrate the group's 20th anniversary, the museum contained all the group's releases as well as official costumes and merchandise sold throughout their 20-year career.

On February 12, TV Tokyo aired the Morning Musume 20 Shuunen Kinen Special starring 25 current and former members of Morning Musume: all thirteen Morning Musume '18 members and OG members Nakazawa Yuko, Iida Kaori, Ishiguro Aya, Abe Natsumi, Fukuda Asuka, Yaguchi Mari, Ishikawa Rika, Yoshizawa Hitomi, Tsuji Nozomi, Takahashi Ai, Niigaki Risa, and Michishige Sayumi. The show included a talk corner about group history, a look back at Hello! Morning, and several studio performances.

On March 14, the group attended a press conference to announce a collaboration between au and Hello! Project titled "Oto no VR", which will deliver 360° video and audio content for smartphones, starting with a video of Morning Musume '18 singing "I WISH". That following evening, Morning Musume '18 performed in the second part of the SKY PerfecTV! Ongakusai 2018 alongside Tsubaki Factory.

On March 27, Hello! Project announced Haruna Ogata's graduation. She cited the reason for graduation being due to failing to pass her university entrance exams due to her focus being split between education and activities as a member of the group. On June 13, Morning Musume '18 released their 65th single and Ogata Haruna's last "Are you Happy? / A gonna". Exactly a week later, on June 20, Haruna Ogata graduated at Nippon Budokan, the last stop of their Spring 2018 tour.

After the end of their Spring 2018 tour, the group began to focus on performing at the mid year specials for various music shows. On June 27, Morning Musume '18 performed "Are you Happy?", their first performance without Ogata, on TV Tokyo Music Festival 2018. During the show, eight former Morning Musume members, Nakazawa Yuko, Ishiguro Aya, Iida Kaori, Asuka Fukuda, Yasuda Yasuda, Mari Yaguchi, Maki Goto, and Hitomi Yoshizawa, performed a special medley of their most iconic songs. This was Goto's first performance with the group in over 5 years. Morning Musume '18 also performed in TBS's Ongaku no Hi 2018 on July 14, and on July 25, had a special collaboration with Da Pump for the 2018 FNS Uta no Natsu Matsuri where they both performed Da Pump's famous song, "U.S.A" and a medley of Morning Musume's song "Are you happy?" and "The Peace.". On August 12, they performed at rockin'on presents ROCK IN JAPAN FES.2018 on the Lake Stage.

On August 17, 2018, Iikubo Haruna announced on her blog that she will graduate from both Morning Musume '18 and Hello! Project at the end of the fall tour Morning Musume '18 Concert Tour Aki "Get Set, Go!".

On September 14, the group celebrated their 21st anniversary. During the event they announced a collaboration with Caribadix, an anime short series produced by Sanrio and rockin'on about a group of animals who form a rock band. Morning Musume '18 would become cheer characters named "Gaokkii" who appear in each of the 12 members' colors with their symbolic motif. The characters are featured in goods sold at the Morning Musume '18 Concert Tour Aki ~GET SET, GO!~ and also in stores.

On October 24, Morning Musume '18 released their 66th single and Iikubo Haruna's last "Furari Ginza / Jiyuu na Kuni Dakara". On December 12, they performed on the second night of Fuji TV's 2018 FNS Kayousai, marking Iikubo's final television appearance as a member of the group, and on December 16, Iikubo graduated at Nippon Budokan.

On November 10, 2018, Morning Musume '18 held their first concert in Mexico. A week later, on November 17, they performed in the Anisong World Matsuri at Anime NYC 2018 in New York City, which included a panel and autograph signing session the day before. To promote these two overseas appearances, a YouTube live stream was held on October 5 JST with the members answering fans' questions.

During the Hello! Project 20th Anniversary!! Hello! Project Countdown Party 2018 "Good Bye & Hello!" on December 31, 10th generation member Ishida Ayumi was appointed as a new sub-leader of the group alongside Ikuta Erina.

During the opening concert of the Hello! Project 20th Anniversary!! Hello! Project 2019 Winter tour on January 2, the Morning Musume '19 LOVE Audition in search of 15th generation member(s) to join the group was announced.

On March 13, they released the compilation album Best! Morning Musume 20th Anniversary. The album included all songs from the last 10 years, from Mikan in 2007 to their most recent single Furari Ginza. As the songs are unedited, all members who were active from the release of Mikan till present, can be heard in the album and appear on the covers of the album, although all the graduated members aren't credited.

On June 12, the group released their 67th single "Seishun Night / Jinsei Blues". During their release event at Ikebukuro Sunshine City Fountain Square, it was announced that the 15th generation would be revealed on June 22 at 5:00 PM JST in a YouTube live stream. This is the first time the group has revealed its members to the general public and members in this format.

On June 22, the 15th generation were announced in a YouTube live stream on Morning Musume's official channel at 5:00 PM JST, The new members were revealed to be Rio Kitagawa, child actress and model Homare Okamura and former Hello! Pro Kenshuusei Hokkaido member Mei Yamazaki. They were introduced on stage during the Hello! Project 2019 Summer concert tour from July 13 and would begin performing with the group in the Morning Musume '19 Concert Tour Aki. With the 15th generation all being younger than Haga Akane, their arrival marks the end of Haga's run as the youngest serving member of the group at 5 years. As the 15th generation members got their official colors, 12th generation Makino Maria revealed that she had changed her Baby Pink color to Pink, which was previously Michishige's color, a member she looks up to. Haga Akane had also changed her color from Light Orange to Orange which was Kudo Haruka's color, whom Haga also looks up to.

On July 10, it was announced that Oda Sakura was diagnosed with cervical degenerative disc disease by the doctor after experiencing severe pain around her left shoulder blade the day before. Due to it requiring one month of treatment, Oda was absent from the Hello! Project 2019 Summer concert tour from July 13 to August 3, as well as a "Jinsei Blues / Seishun Night" release event on July 15.

On August 10, following the success of their performance on last years Lake Stage, Morning Musume '19 were once again invited to perform at rockin'on presents ROCK IN JAPAN FESTIVAL 2019 on the GRASS STAGE, the largest stage in the festival. The group's professionalism and high performance level was praised with many highlighting the group's ability to perform a 50-minute set with no breaks in the peak of hot weather in Japan. With a capacity of over 60,000 people, this was their largest audience to date. This was also Oda Sakura's first performance back with the group after her short medical leave.

2020–2021: Masaki Sato's graduation 

On September 24, it was announced that Sato will be graduating from Morning Musume and Hello! Project on December 13 in order to begin activities as a solo artist. Since February, Sato has been suffering from the effects of irritable bowel syndrome, which has made her absent from several activities that she is satisfied with, mainly concerts and events. Despite her condition improving, it is still interfering with her activities, and she also expressed that it is difficult for her to continue activities as a Morning Musume member as she feels she has been causing trouble for the members and staff. As a result of discussions with her, she decided to improve her condition first than rather continue in the group under the situation where she can not make plans for the future. She also had a strong desire of graduating after a Morning Musume concert, and although she is not without concerns about her health, she has come to the conclusion that the group's upcoming concert at Nippon Budokan, which was originally planned, will be her graduation concert. Sato has also expressed desire to continue her music activities as a solo artist after graduating, so she is planning to distribute singing videos while monitoring her health.

On October 1, she and Ishida Ayumi held a joint fanclub event titled Morning Musume '21 Ishida Ayumi & Sato Masaki FC Event ～Hiyoko ga 10-nen tattara, saa nani ni naru? ~“Mabasude yattenai yo. Semete isho dake ki sasete!” “Iya, taitoru nagai yo!”, featuring two shows at Edogawa cultural center.

On December 1, their TikTok Channel opened.

On December 8, they released their 70th single, Teenage Solution / Yoshi Yoshi Shite Hoshii no / Beat no Wakusei, which was also Sato's last single.

On December 13, Sato Masaki graduated from the group and became a soloist.

2022: Chisaki Morito's and Kaede Kaga's graduations and 16th Generation 

On January 1, Morning Musume '21 changed their name to Morning Musume '22.

On January 2, during the opening concert of the Hello! Project 2022 Winter "Love & Peace" tour, it was announced by Fukumura Mizuki that Morning Musume '22 and Juice=Juice would be holding a holding a joint new member audition titled Hello! Project "Morning Musume '22" "Juice=Juice" Goudou Shin Member Audition.

The audition is open to applicants as of January 2, and the application period will end at 10pm (22:00) JST on February 9, 2021. Any girl living in Japan from 5th grade elementary school to 2nd year of high school are eligible to apply. A website of the audition was opened with more details.

On February 28, it was announced that Morito Chisaki is set to graduate from Morning Musume and Hello! Project on June 20 at the final concert of the Morning Musume '22 Concert Tour "Never Been Better!" at Nippon Budokan.

On June 29, it was announced on a special video of the Hello! Project Station that Rio Sakurai had passed the final round of the Hello! Project "Morning Musume '22" "Juice=Juice" Goudou Shin Member Audition, becoming a member of Morning Musume '22.

On September 3, it was announced that Kaga Kaede is set to graduate from Morning Musume and Hello! Project on December 10 at the final concert of the Morning Musume '22 25th Anniversary Concert Tour "Singin' To The Beat", so that she will be able to go and study dancing.

On September 14, Morning Musume '22 announced their 25 Shuunen Kinen -Asu wo Tsukuru no wa Kimi- Audition during the Morning Musume '22 Kessei 25 Shunen Kinen FC Event "Musume × Fan×Fun! × Dai Kansha-sai!" concert. This was to look for a 17th generation.

On December 21, Morning Musume '22 released their 72nd single, Swing Swing Paradise / Happy birthday to Me!.

On December 27, it was announced that Mizuki Fukumura is set to graduate from Morning Musume and Hello! Project after their concert tour to be held in fall of 2023.

Life in the group
The audition process has been described by Ai Takahashi as involving a training camp of three days and two nights, in which participants were expected to learn a new song, a dance routine and a script.

The girls are afforded three holidays a year of five days each, in winter, in summer, and for the New Year.

In the past, the group has always had a leader and sub-leader, though neither comes with any responsibility. Takahashi has said that the role merely includes encouraging the others to do their best, while according to Niigaki, "there is nothing I have to do [as a sub-leader], but I want to support [the leader]."

International activities

Asia 
In addition to already having official fan clubs in Taiwan and South Korea, Hello! Project and Morning Musume began actively extending its fanbase outside Japan and primarily into the rest of Asia starting from the middle of 2007 and into 2008.

In March 2007, Morning Musume inducted its first two non-Japanese members from China, Li Chun (Jun Jun) of Hunan and Qian Lin (Lin Lin) of Hangzhou. Along with Eri Kamei, the two left in 2010 after the group failed to break into China due to piracy levels.

In addition to the unveiling of Hello! Project's Taiwanese website in 2007, Hello! Project has also launched the Taiwan H.P. New Star Audition as well; an audition aimed at recruiting new members to join Hello! Project as Hello Pro Egg members. At this audition, Morning Musume also performed as well.

Morning Musume also held their 10th Anniversary Live Tour in Korea in June 2008.

On October 5, 2016, Morning Musume '16 attended a fan meeting in Seoul, South Korea and then on October 6 they performed in the MU:CON LIVE AMN Big Concert at DMC Festival 2016, which took place in the Sangam Culture Plaza.

On October 15, 2016, Morning Musume '16 performed "Utakata Saturday Night!" on TVBS's Quan Qiu Zhong Wen Yin Yue Bang Shang Bang (全球中文音樂榜上榜; Global Chinese Music Live), a live Taiwanese music program. The next day on October 16, the group held a live concert in Taipei. Two months before on August 16, members Fukumura Mizuki, Kudo Haruka, and Ogata Haruna visited Taipei for a press event outside of the Red House Theater to promote the concert.

On March 12 and 19, 2017, Morning Musume '17 appeared on the Taiwanese show Riben Tian Nan Di Bei You (日本天南地北遊; Traveling All Over Japan).[67] The group members split into pairs and give tours to Taiwanese celebrities around Kyushu in the first episode and Hokkaido and Okinawa in the second episode.

Morning Musume '17 held a concert in Hong Kong on June 25, 2017.

Europe 
In France, Morning Musume music videos are aired on a television channel called Nolife, a channel that features video games and Japanese music.

On Friday, July 1, 2010, Morning Musume made their first appearance at the Japan Expo 2010 in Paris, France as guest of honor. "Tomo", the coupling track to the group's 43rd single, "Seishun Collection", was the event's theme song.

North America 
On February 12, 2009, it was announced that Morning Musume would be performing in the United States at the 2009 Anime Expo, the nation's largest anime convention, as one of the first official guests of honor. Niigaki stated that "The movies that Disney makes are full of dreams, but when I have children, I'd like them to know about war, the pain of death and such things, so I hope they will watch anime."

It was also announced that "3, 2, 1 Breakin' Out!", the coupling track of their upcoming single "Shōganai Yume Oibito", would be the official theme song for Anime Expo 2009. The convention was held at the Los Angeles Convention Center in Los Angeles, California on July 2 to 5.

On Sunday, October 5, 2014, Morning Musume '14 made their first appearance at the Best Buy Theater in New York City, New York. The concert was sponsored by New York Comic Con. Of the experience Sayumi Michishige shares "We had an overwhelming welcome from the New York fans, and we really could feel that they've really been waiting for us all along. It made us very happy."

From February 26 to 28, 2016, Morning Musume '16 were main guests at Anime Matsuri in Houston, Texas to celebrate the convention's 10th anniversary, which took place at the George R. Brown Convention Center. On Friday, February 26, the group appeared in the opening ceremony and held a Q&A session afterwards. Their concert was held on Saturday, February 27, which they performed a total of 16 songs in front of 6,000 people. Former member Mitsui Aika accompanied the group and was the concert MC. There were originally plans for members Iikubo Haruna and Kudo Haruka to participate in the Friday J-Fashion Show as models, but they did not appear.

Members

 Mizuki Fukumura (2011–2023)
 Erina Ikuta (2011–)
 Ayumi Ishida (2011–)
 Sakura Oda (2012–)
 Miki Nonaka (2014–)
 Maria Makino (2014–)
 Akane Haga (2014–)
 Reina Yokoyama (2016–)
 Rio Kitagawa  (2019–)
 Homare Okamura (2019–)
 Mei Yamazaki (2019–)
 Rio Sakurai (2022–)

Member Timeline

Blue (vertical) = Indie singles
Red (vertical) = Major singles
Green (vertical) = Studio albums

Subgroups

 Tanpopo
 Petitmoni
 Mini-Moni
 Morning Musume Sakuragumi
 Morning Musume Otomegumi
 Morning Musume Tanjō 10nen Kinentai

Discography

 First Time (1998)
 Second Morning (1999)
 3rd: Love Paradise (2000)
 4th Ikimasshoi! (2002)
 No. 5 (2003)
 Ai no Dai 6 Kan (2004)
 Rainbow 7 (2006)
 Sexy 8 Beat (2007)
 Platinum 9 Disc (2009)
 10 My Me (2010)
 Fantasy! Jūichi (2010)
 12, Smart (2011)
 13 Colorful Character (2012)
 14 Shō: The Message (2014)
 15 Thank You, Too (2017)
 16th ~That's J-POP~ (2021)

Milestones and awards

 Oricon – Most Top 10 singles by an artist in Japan.
 Oricon – Most number one singles by a female group in Japan, beating the previous record set by Pink Lady. The record was later beaten by AKB48 in 2012.
 Oricon – Most consecutive Top 10 singles by a female group in Japan.
 Oricon – Best single selling female group in Japan—22,103,479 copies sold, their fifth Oricon record. The record was later beaten by AKB48 in 2012.

Golden Arrow Award
The Golden Arrow Award is presented by the Japan Magazine Publishers Association (JMPA) to recognize excellence in domestic media, such as in film, television, and music.

|-
| 1998 || Morning Musume || Newcomer Award (Music) || 
|-
| 1999 || Morning Musume || Music Award ||

Japan Academy Prize
The Japan Academy Prize is presented by the Japan Academy Film Prize Association for excellence in Japanese film.

|-
| rowspan="2" | 2001 || Morning Musume || Popularity Award || 
|-
| Pinch Runner || Newcomer Award ||

Japan Cable Awards
The Japan Cable Awards are sponsored by the National Cable Music Broadcasters Association and are based on requests from the audience received by cable broadcasters.

|-
| 1999 || "Love Machine" || Excellence Award (Pops) || 
|-
| 2000 || "I Wish" || Excellence Award (Pops) ||

Japan Gold Disc Awards
The Japan Gold Disc Awards are the Recording Industry Association of Japan's annual music awards.

|-
| 1999 || Morning Musume || New Artist of the Year || 
|-
| rowspan="2" | 2000 || "Love Machine" || Song of the Year || 
|-
| "Koi no Dance Site" || Song of the Year || 
|-
| rowspan="5" | 2001 || "Happy Summer Wedding" || Song of the Year || 
|-
| 3rd: Love Paradise || Pop Album of the Year || 
|-
| Best! Morning Musume 1 || Pop Album of the Year || 
|-
| The Video Koi no Dance Site || Music Video of the Year (short term) || 
|-
| Video The Morning Musume Best 10 || Music Video of the Year (long term) ||

Japan Record Awards
The Japan Record Awards are presented by the Japan Composer's Association for outstanding achievements in the record industry.

|-
| rowspan="2" | 1998 || Morning Musume || Best New Artist Award || 
|-
| Morning Musume || New Artist Award || 
|-
| rowspan="2" | 1999 || "Love Machine" || Japan Record Award || 
|-
| "Love Machine" || Gold Award || 
|-
| rowspan="2" | 2000 || "Koi no Dance Site" || Japan Record Award || 
|-
| "Koi no Dance Site" || Gold Award ||

Billboard Japan Music Awards
The Billboard Japan Music Awards are an annual set of music awards, founded by Billboard Japan, the Japanese online edition of the music magazine Billboard. In 2013, Morning Musume was awarded for the most active live performance act.

|-
| 2013 || Morning Musume || Active Artist of the Year || 
|-

See also
 List of best-selling music artists in Japan
 List of Morning Musume members
 Morning Musume discography
 Morning Musume appearances
 Dream Morning Musume
 Gatas Brilhantes H.P.
 List of best-selling girl groups

References
 
All Up-Front Works discography pages are in Japanese.

 
Hello! Project groups
Japanese idol groups
Japanese girl groups
Japanese electropop groups
Japanese dance music groups
Musical groups established in 1997
1997 establishments in Japan
Japanese pop music groups
Musical groups from Tokyo
Japanese dance groups
Child musical groups